Kheda District is one of the thirty-three districts of Gujarat state in western India. It is part of the region known as Charotar, consisting of Kheda and Anand districts.. Its central city Nadiad is the administrative headquarters of the district.

History

Formerly known as Kaira district, it was divided in two with the southern part becoming Anand district in 1997. The Charotar region of Kaira consisted of four talukas (sub-districts): Nadiad, Anand, Borsad, and Petlad. When the district was divided, Nadiad Taluka went with Kheda district and the other three with Anand district. Today,  Kheda has eleven talukas. Balasinor and Virpur, once in Kheda district, were moved to the newly formed Mahisagar district in 2013.

During the Indian independence movement in the first half of the 20th century, the Patidars of the Charotar region and other areas in Kaira resisted the British in a number of standoffs, notably the Kaira anti-tax campaign of 1913, the Kheda Satyagraha of 1918, the Borsad Satyagraha of 1923, and the Bardoli Satyagraha of 1928.

Demographics

According to the 2011 census Kheda district has a population of 2,299,885, roughly equal to the nation of Latvia or the US state of New Mexico. This gives it a ranking of 197th in India (out of a total of 640). Its population growth rate over the decade 2001-2011 was 12.81%. Kheda has a sex ratio of 937 females for every 1000 males, and a literacy rate of 84.31%.

The divided district had a population of 2,053,769, of which 474,041 (23.08%) lived in urban areas. The divided district had a sex ratio of 940 females per 1000 males. Scheduled Castes and Scheduled Tribes made up 98,686 (4.81%) and 37,310 (1.82%) of the population respectively.

Hindus are 1,780,801, while Muslims are 239,214 and Christians are 26,387.

Language

At the time of the 2011 census, 97.14% of the population spoke Gujarati and 2.01% Hindi as their first language.

Administrative divisions
Since 2013, Kheda district has been divided into eleven taluka.
Nadiad (city)
Thasra (code 03878), city of Dakor, villages include Kalsar,
Kapadvanj, villages include Abvel, Antroli, Ghadiya, Telnar
Mehmedabad (Mahemdavad), headquartered in the town of Mahemdavad, villages include Haldarvas, Kanij, Sarsavani
Kathlal, villages include Anara, Bajakapura
Matar, headquartered in Matar village, villages include Asamali
Mahudha, headquartered in the municipality of Mahisa, Mahudha, villages include Heranj
Kheda, villages include Dedarda, Vavdi
Nadiad (rural), villages include Davda 
Galteshwar (villages include Anghadi, Kuni, Pali 
Vaso, headquartered in Vaso, villages include Palana, Rampur (Rampura)

Politics
  

|}

Notable people
 Govardhanram Tripathi (1855–1907) Writer; born in Nadiad.
 Manilal Nabhubhai (1858–1898) Writer and philosopher; born in Nadiad.
 Ravji Patel (1939–1968) Modernist poet and novelist; born in Vallavpura village.
 Sardar Vallabhbhai Patel (1875 – 1950) Indian freedom fighter and first Home minister of India; born in Nadiad
Indulal Yagnik (1892-1972) Indian independence activist, leader of the All India Kisan Sabha, and the most influential leader of the Mahagujarat movement

See also
 Koli rebellions
 Abvel
 Bajakpura
 Nirmali
 Sarsavani
 Telnar

References

External links

 Official site
 Glorious India website.

 
Districts of Gujarat